, with its highest peak Mount Kami (1,438 meters), is a complex volcano in Kanagawa Prefecture, Japan that is truncated by two overlapping calderas, the largest of which is 10 × 11 km wide. The calderas were formed as a result of two major explosive eruptions about 180,000 and 49,000–60,000 years ago. Lake Ashi lies between the southwestern caldera wall and a half dozen post-caldera lava domes that arose along a southwest–northeastern trend cutting through the center of the calderas. Dome growth occurred progressively to the south, and the largest and youngest of them, Mount Kami, forms the high point of Hakone.  The calderas are breached to the east by the Haya River canyon. Mount Ashigara is a parasitic cone.

The latest magmatic eruptive activity at Hakone occurred 2,900 years ago. It produced a pyroclastic flow and a lava dome in the explosion crater, although phreatic eruptions took place as recently as the 12–13th centuries AD.

According to the nearby Hakone Shrine, the Komagatake peak has been the object of religious veneration since ancient times.

Gallery

See also
 List of volcanoes in Japan
 List of mountains in Japan
 History of Mount Hakone

References

External links 

 Hakoneyama - Japan Meteorological Agency 
  - Japan Meteorological Agency
 Hakone Volcano Group - Geological Survey of Japan
 Hakoneyama: Global Volcanism Program - Smithsonian Institution
 Hakone Geopark

Calderas of Honshū
Izu–Bonin–Mariana Arc
Complex volcanoes
Manazuru, Kanagawa
Volcanoes of Kanagawa Prefecture
Pleistocene calderas